Thomas Hine & Co. is a leading manufacturer of cognac, owned by the French company EDV SAS.

Origins
The Hine company is named after its proprietor Thomas Hine (sometimes recorded as Thomas Hone), an Englishman from Dorset, England. The company was founded in 1763. Following his arrest during the French Revolution, Thomas Hine married a young woman, Françoise Elisabeth, whose father owned a cognac house in Jarnac. Hine took the company to new heights, and eventually renamed it Thomas Hine & C°. in 1817.

The House

The Hine House has stood at the banks of the quai de l’Orangerie on the banks of the river Charente in Jarnac, France since the 18th century. It is one of the oldest houses in Jarnac and serves as the company's headquarters.
In 1962, the house was granted a royal warrant from Queen Elizabeth II, as suppliers of cognac. Today it is still the only cognac house to hold this honour.
In 2008, one of the factories of the House was bought by Tigran Arzakantsyan, the owner of Armenian the Great Valley wine and cognac company.

References

External links

 Hine Cognac

Cognac
Distilleries in France
Food and drink companies established in 1817
British Royal Warrant holders
Purveyors to the Imperial and Royal Court